is a passenger railway station in the city of Matsudo, Chiba, Japan, operated by the third sector Hokusō Railway.

Lines

Station layout
This underground station consists of two island platforms serving four tracks.

Platforms

Adjacent stations

History
Yagiri Station was opened on 31 March 1991. On 17 July 2010 a station numbering system was introduced to the Hokusō Line, with the station designated HS02.

Passenger statistics
In fiscal 2018, the station was used by an average of 8056 passengers daily.

Surrounding area
 Matsudo-Yagiri Post Office
 Matsudi City Hall – Yagiri branch office
 Yagiri ferry
Tokyo Medical and Dental University
Wayo Women's University
Chiba University of Commerce

See also
 List of railway stations in Japan

References

External links

 Hokusō Line station information 

Railway stations in Japan opened in 1991
Railway stations in Chiba Prefecture
Hokusō Line
Matsudo